Oktem is a village in Pegunungan Bintang Regency, Highland Papua province, Indonesia. Its population is 301

Climate
Oktem has a very mild and very wet version of an alpine tundra climate with cold and rainy weather year-round. Its one of the very few places with tundra climate which can support tree and forest growth because of its mildness.

References

Villages in Highland Papua